Svetlana Sergeevna Biryukova (née Denyaeva; ; born 1 April 1991) is a Russian track and field athlete who specialises in the long jump.

She served a two-year ban for doping between 2014 and 2016.

Career
That year she won the Russian junior athletics indoor championships and was runner-up at the outdoor meeting.

Biryukova added the triple jump to her oeuvre the following year. She represented Russia in both events at the 2011 European Athletics U23 Championships – she was eliminated in long jump qualifying but came eighth in the triple jump final. She came ninth (upgraded to eighth after Karin Melis Mey was disqualified) at the 2012 European Athletics Championships in her first senior international outing, but managed only tenth place at the Russian Athletics Championships. The 2013 season also had mixed fortunes for Biryukova: she set several personal bests (7.50 for the 60 metres,  in the long jump,  in the triple jump) and placed third at the Russian indoor championships, but did not get past the qualifying of the 2013 European Athletics Indoor Championships – her only outing for Russia that year.

Biryukova had a strong start to 2014. She matched that jump at the Volgograd Governor Cup later that January to beat Tatyana Lebedeva's meeting record. At the Russian indoor championships, Biryukova again got the better of national rival Klishina and won her first national title in the long jump.

She is currently serving a 2-year doping ban for the use of prohibited substances, SARMs. The ban lasts between 26 February 2014 and 3 March 2016.

Personal bests
60 metres – 7.50 sec (2013)
Long jump outdoor –  (2012)
Long jump indoor –  (2014)
Triple jump outdoor –  (2011)
Triple jump indoor –  (2013)

References
 Some sources give the athletes date of birth as 12 May 1991.

External links

Living people
1991 births
Russian female long jumpers
Athletes from Saint Petersburg
Doping cases in athletics
Russian sportspeople in doping cases